Micropterix paykullella is a species of moth belonging to the family Micropterigidae. It was described by Johan Christian Fabricius in 1794. It is distributed locally across the whole Alps, occurring in France, Italy, Austria and Switzerland.

The wingspan is 9–13 mm. Adults are on wing from May to June and fly during the day.

Adults have been found above the timberline (2,200 meters) feeding on pollen of Helianthemum species. They have also been observed swarming around dwarf shrubs in clearings and on the outskirts of forests at lower montane levels.

References

Micropterigidae
Moths described in 1794
Moths of Europe